Ashtone Wayne Henry Morgan (born February 9, 1991) is a Canadian soccer player who plays as a left-back for Forge FC in the Canadian Premier League.

Morgan was the first graduate of the TFC Academy to play for the Canadian National Team.

Early life
Ashtone attended Northern Secondary School in Toronto and played for the Toronto Lynx U-13 squad that travelled to England to play other youth academies. On this trip he was the standout player of the Canadian side earning him invitations from clubs such as Southampton.

Club career

Toronto FC

Morgan joined TFC Academy at age 16 in 2008, and went on to feature for the team in the Canadian Soccer League in 2009 and 2010.

Morgan made his professional debut for Toronto FC on October 20, 2010 in a CONCACAF Champions League match versus Árabe Unido from Panama. Morgan was able to play for the Senior squad of Toronto while not holding a professional contract. The game ended in a 1–0 win for Toronto with Morgan having a stand out performance that earned him much publicity.

In late January 2011 it was announced that Morgan would travel with Toronto's Senior team to Turkey for preseason training camp, Ashtone was one of four academy players invited to travel. He signed with Toronto FC on March 17, 2011. Morgan made his league debut on March 26, 2011 against Portland as a second half sub for Javier Martina. In the last third of the season Morgan became a regular starter for the reds with playing a full 90 minutes in 7 of the last 10 league games. Morgan finished the 2011 season with 14 league games.

Morgan cemented himself as the starting left back for Toronto in the 2012 season, he registered 3 assists in two games in late June. On July 5, the club announced that it had re-signed Morgan to a long-term deal.

However, with the arrival of Justin Morrow, Morgan saw his minutes decrease during the 2014 MLS season, mainly featuring as the club's back-up option at left back. With Morrow entrenched at the position going into the 2015 season, Morgan was loaned to Toronto FC II to get more playing time, while still being able to feature for the first team when needed.  He made his debut for Toronto FC II against the Charleston Battery on March 21. However, with injuries to the first-team back line, Morgan was able to force his way back into the Toronto line-up during the 2015 season, and on May 2 he became the first player in Toronto FC history to make 100 appearances in all competitions for the club in a 1–0 victory over the Philadelphia Union. Despite missing the majority of the 2016 season due to injury, as Toronto FC made it to the 2016 MLS Cup, Morgan relished the club reaching its most successful season to date. Upon completion of the season, Morgan re-signed with Toronto FC before the 2017 season. Toronto declined his option for the 2020 season, ending his time with the club after nine seasons.

Real Salt Lake
On January 21, 2020, it was announced that Morgan would be signing with Real Salt Lake for the 2020 season. In December 2021 the club announced they had declined Morgan's contract option.

Forge FC
On February 1, 2022, Morgan signed with Canadian Premier League side Forge FC. He made his debut for Forge in their 2022 CONCACAF Champions League first-leg match against Cruz Azul on February 16. On January 23, 2023, Morgan re-signed with Forge FC for the 2023 season.

International career
Morgan was a part of several Canadian U-16 camps in 2007, while also appearing for the U-20 side in late 2010. Morgan received his first international senior team call-up in late September when Stephen Hart announced his roster for two FIFA World Cup qualifying games against Saint Lucia and Puerto Rico. This made Morgan the first graduate of the Toronto FC Academy to be called up to the Canadian men's national team. Morgan made his debut against Saint Lucia as a second half sub for Simeon Jackson in a 7–0 away victory, he also received an assist for setting up Iain Hume who scored the 6th goal. Morgan was call-up to the national team in the next international window, Ashtone earned his first start for the national team against Saint Kitts and Nevis on November 15, the game ended in a 4–0 victory for the Canadians at the national stadium of BMO Field. On December 13 Morgan was awarded the 2011 Canadian U-20 Player of the Year, receiving 33.3% of the vote and just beating out Russell Teibert for the award.

On June 27, 2013 Morgan was listed as a part of the confirmed 23-man squad for Colin Miller's Canada squad for 2013 CONCACAF Gold Cup.

On May 30, 2019 Morgan was named to the final squad for the 2019 CONCACAF Gold Cup.

Career statistics

Club

International

Honours

Club
Toronto FC
MLS Cup: 2017
Canadian Championship (5): 2011, 2012, 2016, 2017, 2018
Supporters' Shield: 2017

Individual
Canadian U-20 Players of the Year: 2011

References

External links

1991 births
Living people
Association football defenders
Black Canadian soccer players
Homegrown Players (MLS)
Soccer players from Toronto
Canada men's youth international soccer players
Canada men's international soccer players
Canadian sportspeople of Guyanese descent
Canadian sportspeople of Jamaican descent
Canadian Soccer League (1998–present) players
Canadian soccer players
Major League Soccer players
USL Championship players
Toronto FC players
Toronto FC II players
Real Salt Lake players
Real Monarchs players
Forge FC players
2013 CONCACAF Gold Cup players
2015 CONCACAF Gold Cup players
2019 CONCACAF Gold Cup players
Canadian Premier League players